True Will is a term found within the mystical system of Thelema. It is defined either as a person's grand destiny in life or as a moment-to-moment path of action that operates in perfect harmony with nature. True Will does not spring from conscious intent, but from the interplay between the deepest self and the entire universe. Thelemites in touch with their True Will are said to have eliminated or bypassed their false desires, conflicts, and habits, and accessed their connection with the divine. Theoretically, at this point, the Thelemite acts in alignment with nature, just as a stream flows downhill, with neither resistance nor "lust of result".

Crowley's ideas on the subject partly originated with the teachings of Eliphas Levi, whose magical books emphasize the magician finding their magical identity – his or her 'true self', which Levi referred to as the "True Will".

Explication
According to Crowley, every individual has a True Will, to be distinguished from the ordinary wants and desires of the ego. The True Will is essentially one's "calling" or "purpose" in life. "Do what thou wilt shall be the whole of the Law" for Crowley refers not to hedonism, fulfilling everyday desires, but to acting in response to that calling. According to Lon Milo DuQuette, a Thelemite is anyone who bases their actions on striving to discover and accomplish their true will, when a person does their True Will, it is like an orbit, their niche in the universal order, and the universe assists them:

In The Book of the Law Crowley wrote "Do what thou wilt." True Will directs the individual towards destiny and forces them into the joy of accomplishing what they were meant to accomplish without "lust of result" (outside motivations). In order for the individual to be able to follow their True Will, the everyday self's socially-instilled inhibitions may have to be overcome via deconditioning. 

Crowley believed that in order to discover the True Will, one had to free the desires of the subconscious mind from the control of the conscious mind, especially the restrictions placed on sexual expression, which he associated with the power of divine creation. He identified the True Will of each individual with the Holy Guardian Angel, a daimon unique to each individual. The spiritual quest to find what you are meant to do and do it is also known in Thelema as the Great Work.

In Crowley's writings 

In Crowley's essay The Secret Conference (written under the pseudonym "Gerald Aumont", and prefaced to The Heart of the Master), he suggests that a technique must be devised by which a child's True Will may be discovered at birth, or as early as possible in life, in order to permit the correct ordering of society.

In Crowley's ethical treatise Duty, he identifies True Will with the Nature of the individual. This capitalized "Nature" may be compared with the "Perfect Nature" of earlier Gnostic systems, which was another term for the personal daimon or augoeides, usually referenced by Crowley as the Holy Guardian Angel.

The Message of the Master Therion (Liber II]) is a document that attempts to delineate the doctrine of True Will. By reference to Liber Thisharb, Liber II suggests a theory of metempsychosis, whereby the individual True Will is the result of a person's prior incarnations. But here as elsewhere, Crowley stops short of asserting objective validity for memories of past lives. He recommends developing "the magical memory" as a means to an end, and connecting the aspirant's abilities and remembered past with some purpose. By definition, the aspirant's True Will must fit the aspirant's nature.

In De Lege Libellum (Liber CL), Crowley defines True Will as the will which "does not rest content with things partial and transitory, but...proceed[s] firmly to the End", and in the same passage he identifies that "end" as the destruction of oneself in Love.

See also
 Agency (philosophy)
 Free will
 Great Work (Alchemy)
 Great Work (Hermeticism)
 Great Work (Thelema)
 Will to power
 Ziran

References

Citations

Works cited
 

 

Conceptions of self
Thelema